Chimalapa Zoque or Oaxaca Zoque is a Zoquean language of the municipalities of Santa María Chimalapa (settlements of Arroyo Cuchara, Arroyo Chichihua, Arroyo Pita, Cabecera Chalchijapa (Congregación), Cofradía Chimalapa (La Cofradía), Cuyulapa, Escolapa, La Esmeralda, La Esperanza, Nicolás Bravo, Pilar Espinosa de León, Santa Inés, Santa María Chimalapa, Tierra Blanca, and Zacatal) and San Miguel Chimalapa (settlements of Barrancón, Benito Juárez (El Trébol), Cieneguilla, Cuauhtémoc Guadalupe, El Palmar, El Porvenir, La Ciénega, La Compuerta, Las Anonas, Las Conchas, Las Cruces, López Portillo, Los Limones, Palo Colorado (Emiliano Zapata), Río Grande, San Antonio, San Felipe, San Miguel Chimalapa, and Vista Hermosa) in Oaxaca, Mexico.

References

Indigenous languages of Mexico
Mesoamerican languages
Mixe–Zoque languages